Guy Péqueux (18 June 1942 – 7 January 2021) was a French painter and lithographer.

Biography
Péqueux was born in Montmorillon during World War II. A poor student, he discovered painting while staying with his grandmother in Chaumont-Porcien. He then showed exhibitions in Bar-le-Duc, Beaulieu-en-Argonne, and Nancy before starting a series of personal exhibitions in Troyes in 1966, where he befriended Paul Rebeyrolle.

Péqueux solidified his style of expressionism in trips to the Nordic countries, Russia, the Caucasus, the Middle East, Africa, and Greece. The blue colors in his works were typically seen as symbolism for the cold of Scandinavia, while the ochre and red were depicted from the heat of Jordan and the Sahara Desert.

Péqueux died in Bréviandes on 7 January 2021 at the age of 78.

Book illustrations
À la fuite de quoi, Un carnet du couchant, Les Étoffes de l'auprès, Survol animal entre 7 et 8 by Florian Chantôme (2005)

Collections
Péqueux's work is held in the following public collections:
Musée des beaux-arts de Troyes, Structure de paysage
Musée Dubois-Boucher, Nogent-sur-Seine

References

1942 births
2021 deaths
20th-century French lithographers
20th-century French painters
People from Montmorillon 
French male painters